Dawlatabad District (Pashto/) is a landlocked district, located in the northwestern part of Balkh province, in northern Afghanistan. The population is 101,900 people. The capital is the village of Dowlatabad (Pop: 12,400) at 298 m height above sea level.

Major ethnic groups in this district are Uzbek, Turkmen, Tajik, Hazara, Pashtun, and Arab.

History 

In the 12th century, the region was missed by Genghis Khan and the invading Mongols.

Archaeology has taken place in the district, including works by the French Archaeological Delegation in Afghanistan (DAFA).

On 14 March 2020, the Ministry of Public Health announced that the district had its first positive case of coronavirus disease in Balkh province, during the 2019-COVID-19 pandemic and outbreak in Afghanistan. The 23-year-old patient had fled Bo Ali Sina Hospital after testing positive.

Landmarks

The Zadian Minaret, a sun-baked clay minaret built by the Seljuks in the 12th century, is located in Zadian village. There is also a central market in Dowlatabad.

Places 
The district consists of 52 villages located around the center of the district. 
Dilberjin
Dowlatabad
Kheyrabad
Qarchi Gak
Qowl Taq
Zadian

References

External links
 Map of Settlements iMMAP, September 2011

Districts of Balkh Province